CAFF may refer to:
Cambridge African Film Festival
Canadian Association of Fringe Festivals
Central Asian Football Association
Chinese American Film Festival
Cyprus Amateur Football Federation

See also
Caff (disambiguation)